Robert Bennett (21 January 1822 – 18 January 1891) was a politician and Mayor of Melbourne, Australia between 1861 and 1862.

Bennett was born in Tanderagee, County Armagh, Ireland, and arrived in the Port Phillip District in January 1842. In November 1856 he was elected to the Victorian Legislative Assembly for East Bourke, holding the seat until June 1857. He held the same seat again from October 1859 to August 1864.

Bennett died in Northcote, Victoria on 18 January 1891.

References

 

Mayors and Lord Mayors of Melbourne
1822 births
1891 deaths
Members of the Victorian Legislative Assembly
People from County Armagh
Irish emigrants to colonial Australia
19th-century Australian politicians